James Arthur Dean (February 25, 1925 – November 14, 2000), nicknamed "The Original", was an American Negro league pitcher in the 1940s.

A native of Ambler, Pennsylvania, he played for the Philadelphia Stars for four seasons between 1946 and 1950, and also played for the New York Black Yankees and the New York Cubans. Dean went on to study chemistry at Morris Brown College and worked for Merck Pharmaceuticals for 33 years. He died in 2000 at age 75.

References

1925 births
2000 deaths
Place of death missing
New York Black Yankees players
New York Cubans players
Philadelphia Stars players